Carolyn Inez McCormick (born September 19, 1959) is an American actress who played Dr. Elizabeth Olivet in the Law & Order franchise.

Life and career
McCormick was born and raised in Midland, Texas, and graduated first in her class from The Kinkaid School in Houston in 1977. She graduated with honors from Williams College in 1981 with a B.F.A. She also holds an M.F.A. from the American Conservatory Theater in San Francisco. She has worked in television, movies, theatre, and voice acting.

Her breakthrough role was in Enemy Mine, directed by Wolfgang Petersen with Dennis Quaid. Her other film credits include Woody Allen's Whatever Works, You Know My Name with Sam Elliott, and A Simple Twist of Fate with Steve Martin.

Her first notable television credit was as district attorney Rita Fiore in Spenser: For Hire, in 1986-1987.  She appeared as the holodeck simulation Minuet in "11001001", a first-season episode of Star Trek: The Next Generation, and later as Minuet Riker (William Riker's wife) in a fantasy-alternate universe during the fourth-season episode "Future Imperfect".

The role for which McCormick would become best known was as Dr. Elizabeth Olivet, a consulting psychologist for the prosecution on Law & Order. She appeared in approximately half of the episodes of the NBC series between 1994 and 2006.

In 1997, she played the unhappy wife of a police psychiatrist, played by Robert Pastorelli, in the short-lived Americanized version of the British series Cracker. She has been a guest star on series including Madam Secretary, Elementary, Blue Bloods, Judging Amy, The Practice, Body of Proof, Cold Case, Homicide: Life on the Street, and LA Law.

McCormick also performs on stage. She appeared at the Off-Broadway Cherry Lane Theatre in Eve-olution  with The Cosby Show star Sabrina Le Beauf in 2004. She has also appeared in Dinner with Friends, Oedipus, Ancestral Voices, The Donahue Sisters, Laureen's Whereabouts and In Perpetuity. She worked with Thomas Kail at The Flea Theatre in A. R. Gurney's Family Furniture (2013). In 2015, she appeared in Vanya, Sonya, Masha and Spike at the PaperMill Playhouse and What I Did Last Summer at the Signature 2015. She appeared in the Broadway productions of The Dinner Party in 2001 as Mariette Levieux, Private Lives (standby) in 2002, and in Equus in 2008 as Dora Strang. In 2012, she appeared opposite her husband, Byron Jennings, in the Off-Broadway production of Ten Chimneys. She appeared Off-Broadway in Will Eno's play The Open House in 2014 (Lucille Lortel nomination, Drama Desk Award). She has recorded many audio books, including the Hunger Games series, and has narrated many Ken Burns documentaries.

Filmography

Film

Television

Video games

Audiobooks
All audiobooks McCormack narrated.

References

External links
 
 
 

1959 births
American stage actresses
American television actresses
American voice actresses
Living people
People from Midland, Texas
The Kinkaid School alumni
Williams College alumni
Actresses from Texas
20th-century American actresses
21st-century American actresses
American Conservatory Theater alumni